The R.B. Schneider House is a historic house in Fremont, Nebraska. It was built in 1887 for R. B. Schneider, a businessman and politician. It was expanded by A. H. Dyer in 1897 and Simon Koberlin in 1909, and remodelled into residential apartments by Thorvald Jensen in 1947. It was designed in the Classical Revival and Queen Anne architectural styles. It has been listed on the National Register of Historic Places since July 15, 1982.

References

National Register of Historic Places in Dodge County, Nebraska
Queen Anne architecture in Nebraska
Neoclassical architecture in Nebraska
Houses completed in 1887